Red Ruthenia, or Red Rus', is a term used since the Middle Ages for the south-western principalities of the Kievan Rus', namely the Principality of Peremyshl and the Principality of Belz. Nowadays the region comprises parts of western Ukraine and adjoining parts of south-eastern Poland. It has also sometimes included parts of Lesser Poland, Podolia, Right-bank Ukraine and Volhynia. Centred on Przemyśl (Peremyshl) and Belz, it has included major cities such as: Chełm, Zamość, Rzeszów, Krosno and Sanok (now all in Poland), as well as Lviv and Ternopil (now in Ukraine).

First mentioned by that name in a Polish chronicle of 1321, Red Ruthenia was the portion of Ruthenia incorporated into Poland by Casimir the Great during the 14th century. The disintegration of Rus', Red Ruthenia was contested by the Grand Duchy of Lithuania (the Gediminids), the Kingdom of Poland (the Piasts), the Kingdom of Hungary and the Kingdom of Galicia–Volhynia. After the Galicia–Volhynia Wars, for about 400 years most of Red Ruthenia became part of Poland as the Ruthenian Voivodeship.

A minority of ethnic Poles have lived since the beginning of the second Millennium in northern parts of Red Ruthenia. The exonym "Ruthenians" usually refers to members of the Rusyn and/or Ukrainian ethnicity.

History

Ethnography 

The first known inhabitants of northern Red Ruthenia were Lendians and White Croats, while subgroups of Rusyns, such as Boykos and Lemkos, lived in the south.

Later Walddeutsche ("Forest Germans"), Jews, Armenians and Poles also made up part of the population. According to Marcin Bielski, although Bolesław I Chrobry settled Germans in the region to defend the borders against Hungary and Kievan Rus' the settlers became farmers. Maciej Stryjkowski described German peasants near Rzeszów, Przemyśl, Sanok, and Jarosław as good farmers. Casimir the Great settled German citizens on the borders of Lesser Poland and Red Ruthenia to join the acquired territory with the rest of his kingdom. In determining the population of late medieval Poland, colonisation and Polish migration to Red Ruthenia, Spiš and Podlachia (whom the Ukrainians called Mazury—poor peasant migrants, chiefly from Mazowsze) should be considered.

During the second half of the 14th century, the Vlachs arrived from the southeastern Carpathians and quickly settled across southern Red Ruthenia. Although during the 15th century the Ruthenians gained a foothold, it was not until the 16th century that the Wallachian population in the Bieszczady Mountains and the Lower Beskids was Ruthenized. From the 14th to the 16th centuries Red Ruthenia underwent rapid urbanization, resulting in over 200 new towns built on the German model (virtually unknown before 1340, when Red Ruthenia was the independent Kingdom of Halych).

Political history

1199 to 1772 

During the early Middle Ages, the region was part of Kievan Rus' and, from 1199, the independent Kingdom of Galicia–Volhynia.

It came under Polish control in 1340, when Casimir the Great acquired it. During his reign from 1333 to 1370, Casimir the Great founded several cities, urbanizing the rural province.

The Polish name Ruś Czerwona (translated as "Red Rus") came into use for the territory extending to the Dniester, centring on Przemyśl (Peremyshl). Since the reign of Władysław Jagiełło (d. 1434) the Przemyśl Voivodeship was called the Ruthenian Voivodeship (województwo ruskie), centring on Lwów. The voivodeship consisted of five regions: Lwów, Sanok, Halicz (Halych), Przemyśl (Peremyshl), and Chełm. The town of Halych gave its name to Galicia. During the 1340s, the influence of the Rurik dynasty ended; most of the area passed to Casimir the Great, with Kiev and the state of Volhynia falling under the control of the Grand Duchy of Lithuania. The Polish region was divided into a number of voivodeships, and an era of German eastward migration and Polish settlement among the Ruthenians began. Armenians and Jews also migrated to the region. A number of castles were built at this time, and the cities of Stanisławów (Stanyslaviv in Ukrainian, now Ivano-Frankivsk) and Krystynopol (now Chervonohrad) were founded.

In October 1372, Władysław Opolczyk was deposed as count palatine. Although he retained most of his castles and goods in Hungary, his political influence waned. As compensation, Opolczyk was made governor of Hungarian Galicia. In this new position, he contributed to the economic development of the territories entrusted to him. Although Opolczyk primarily resided in Lwów, at the end of his rule he spent more time in Halicz. The only serious conflict during his time as governor involved his approach to the Eastern Orthodox Church, which angered the local Catholic boyars. Under Polish rule 325 towns were founded from the 14th century to the second half of the 17th century, most during the 15th and 16th centuries (96 and 153, respectively).

Ruthenia was subject to repeated Tatar and Ottoman Empire incursions during the 16th and 17th centuries and was impacted by the Khmelnytsky Uprising (1648–1654), the 1654–1667 Russo-Polish War and Swedish invasions during the Deluge (1655–1660); the Swedes returned during the Great Northern War of the early 18th century. Red Ruthenia consisted of three voivodeships: Ruthenia, whose capital was Lviv and provinces were Lviv, Halych, Sanok, Przemyśl and Chełm; Bełz, separating the provinces of Lviv and Przemyśl from the rest of the Ruthenian voivodeship; and Podolia, with its capital at Kamieniec Podolski.

Ruthenian Voivodeship
 Chełm Land (Ziemia Chełmska), Chełm
 Chełm County, (Powiat Chełmski), Chełm
 Powiat of Ratno, (Powiat Ratneński), Ratno
 Halych Land (Ziemia Halicka), Halicz
 Powiat of Halicz, (Powiat Halicki), Halicz
 Kolomyja County, (Powiat Kołomyjski), Kołomyja
 Trembowla County, (Powiat Trembowelski), Trembowla
 Lwów Land (Ziemia Lwowska), Lwów
 Powiat of Lwów, (Powiat Lwowski), Lwów
 Powiat of Żydaczów, (Powiat Żydaczowski), Żydaczów* Przemyśl Land (Ziemia Przemyska), Przemyśl; Its area was 12,000 km2. and in the 17th century it was divided five smaller regions (county, powiaty).
 Przemyśl County (Powiat Przemyski), Przemyśl
 Powiat of Sambor, (Powiat Samborski), Sambor
 Powiat of Drohobycz, (Powiat Drohobycki), Drohobycz
 Powiat of Stryj, (Powiat Stryjski), Stryj
 Sanok Land (Ziemia Sanocka), Sanok
 Sanok County (Powiat Sanocki), Sanok: Intensive settlement occurred from the 13th to 15th centuries in an area flanked by the Wisłok, San and Wisłoka Rivers. The Vlachs primarily engaged in agriculture; moving west, they established a number of villages during the 15th century. In Sanok Land were six Jewish communities, with synagogues and kahal organizations. Sixteenth- and seventeenth-century Jewish Communities were also autonomous in criminal law.

 
Bełz Voivodeship
 Belz County, (Powiat Bełzski), Bełz
 Grabowiec County, (Powiat Grabowiecki), Grabowiec
 Horodło County, (Powiat Horodelski), Horodło
 Lubaczów County, (Powiat Lubaczowski), Lubaczów
 Busk Land, (Ziemia Buska), Busk

1772 to 1918 
Red Ruthenia (except for Podolia) was conquered by the Austrian Empire in 1772 during the First Partition of Poland, remaining part of the empire until 1918. Between World Wars I and II, it belonged to the Second Polish Republic. The region is currently split, with its western portion in southeastern Poland (around Rzeszów, Przemyśl, Zamość and Chełm) and its eastern portion (around Lviv) in western Ukraine.

See also 

Cherven Cities
 Ruthenia
 White Ruthenia
 Black Ruthenia
 Ivano-Frankivsk Oblast
 Slovak invasion of Poland
 Stanisławów Voivodeship
 Eastern Galicia
District of Galicia
Lwów Voivodeship
Ruthenian Voivodeship

Sources 
 "Monumenta Poloniae Historica"
 Akta grodzkie i ziemskie z archiwum ziemskiego. Lauda sejmikowe. Tom XXIII, XXIV, XXV.
 Słownik geograficzny Królestwa Polskiego (Digital edition)
 Lustracja województwa ruskiego, podolskiego i bełskiego, 1564-1565 Warszawa, (I) edition 2001, pages 289. 
 Lustracje dóbr królewskich XVI-XVIII wieku. Lustracja województwa ruskiego 1661—1665. Część III ziemie halicka i chełmska. Polska Akademia Nauk - Instytut Historii. 1976
 Lustracje województw ruskiego, podolskiego i bełskiego 1564 - 1565, wyd. K. Chłapowski, H. Żytkowicz, cz. 1, Warszawa - Łódź 1992
 Lustracja województwa ruskiego 1661-1665, cz. 1: Ziemia przemyska i sanocka, wyd. K. Arłamowski i W. Kaput, Wrocław-Warszawa-Kraków. 1970
 Aleksander Jabłonowski. Polska wieku XVI, t. VII, Ruś Czerwona, Warszawa 1901 i 1903.

References 

 
Historical regions in Poland
Historical regions in Ukraine
Podkarpackie Voivodeship
History of Lviv Oblast
History of Ivano-Frankivsk Oblast
History of Ternopil Oblast
Ruthenians in the Polish–Lithuanian Commonwealth
History of Carpathian Ruthenia